The Shangqiu–Hefei–Hangzhou high-speed railway, or Shanghehang high-speed railway, is a high-speed railway in China. It opened in three sections from 2019 to 2022.

History
The Shangqiu to Hefei section begun operation on 1 December 2019. The Hefei to Huzhou section began operation on 28 June 2020. The section from Huzhou to Tonglu in Hangzhou (formerly known as Huzhou–Hangzhou high-speed railway) opened on 22 September 2022.

Route
The line runs parallel to the Hefei–Bengbu high-speed railway between Shuijiahu and Hefei South.

Stations

References

High-speed railway lines in China
Railway lines opened in 2019